Gwendoline Kirby LVO (1911–2007) was a British nurse, and matron of Great Ormond Street Hospital.

She met Queen Elizabeth II when she made an official visit to the hospital in 1952, its centenary, formally greeted her on behalf of the hospital when she visited Princess Anne after the latter's 1958 tonsillectomy, and met her again at the hospital's 150th anniversary celebration, when the queen recognised her.

She appeared as a castaway on the BBC Radio programme Desert Island Discs on 24 December 1966. She died in 2007.

References 

Living people
Year of birth missing (living people)
Place of birth missing (living people)
British nurses
Great Ormond Street Hospital
Nurses from London